İbrahim Bölükbaşı (born 1 December 1990) is a Turkish freestyle wrestler. He competed at the 2012 and 2016 Olympics, and was eliminated in early rounds. He took up wrestling aged 11.

References

External links
 

1990 births
People from Pasinler
Living people
Olympic wrestlers of Turkey
Wrestlers at the 2012 Summer Olympics
European Games competitors for Turkey
Wrestlers at the 2015 European Games
Turkish male sport wrestlers
Wrestlers at the 2016 Summer Olympics
20th-century Turkish people
21st-century Turkish people